Espinoza v. Montana Department of Revenue, 591 U.S. ___ (2020), was a landmark United States Supreme Court case in which the Court ruled that a state-based scholarship program that provides public funds to allow students to attend private schools cannot discriminate against religious schools under the Free Exercise Clause of the Constitution.

Background

The state of Montana passed a special income tax credit program in 2015 to help fund non-profit scholarship organizations to help low-income families pay for private schools. For tax payers, they were able to pay up to  into the program and receive a dollar-for-dollar state tax credit to support it. This type of tax-credit scholarship program for private school selection is similar to ones in eighteen other states as of 2019.

Montana, as with 37 other states, have so-called Blaine amendments in their constitutions which were originally designed to prevent funding Catholic schools in the 19th century. Jonathan A. Greenblatt, chief executive of the Anti-Defamation League, said that the continued purpose of these Blaine amendments "serve significant government interests — leaving the support of churches to church members, while also protecting houses of worship against discrimination and interference from the government." 

Montana's constitution bars the uses of "any direct or indirect appropriations or payment" to any religious organizations or schools affiliated with religious organizations, also known as the "no-aid" provision. The Montana Department of Revenue (DoR) developed the program's rules around the no-aid provision and disallowed religious-affiliated schools from receiving any of the scholarship money, otherwise known as "Rule 1". Rule 1 was controversial even within the state government, as both state legislators and the attorney general had asserted it was not needed, but the DoR implemented it against their cautions, asserting that the scholarship funds were equivalent to appropriations and thus covered by the no-aid provision.

Three low-income families who had children attended Stillwater Christian School in Flathead County and would have been eligible for scholarships through the program outside of their school choice filed a lawsuit against the state and sought an injunction against the program, asserting that Rule 1 unnecessary against the no-aid provision and that it discriminated against them due to their religion under the First Amendment to the United States Constitution. Their lawsuit was supported by the Institute for Justice, a non-profit organization that has fought against state laws that enforce the Blaine amendments in their constitutions. They obtained the injunction to block the DoR from enforcing the rule in April 2016. The state began to appeal this ruling, but otherwise continued the program with the ordered injunction, which allowed additional scholarships to be granted for several children attending Stillwater.

The state's appeal to the Montana Supreme Court was decided in December 2018, which ruled in a 5–2 decision that the entire program was unconstitutional because it benefited religious schools. The Court majority stated that the "[Constitution of Montana] more broadly prohibits 'any' state aid to sectarian schools and draws a more stringent line than that drawn by [the U.S. Constitution]." Further, the Court found that even with the DoR's Rule 1 in place, the program still could not prevent any type of aid from the program from ending up at a religious school, and thus nullified the entire program.

Supreme Court
The families petitioned to the United States Supreme Court for review, seeking review of the Montana Supreme Court's decision to terminate the program on the basis of the Religion Clauses or Equal Protection Clause. The Supreme Court granted certiorari in June 2019.

Oral arguments were heard on January 22, 2020. The Justices focused on whether the Montana Supreme Court's decision to shut down the entire program was discriminatory towards the secular schools, as well as trying to resolve this case with recent decision related to the Free Exercise Clause, such as Trinity Lutheran Church of Columbia, Inc. v. Comer, in which the Court previously ruled that blocking public funds to be used by a church to improve playground safety was a violation of the Free Exercise Clause.

Majority opinion
The Court issued its decision on June 30, 2020. The 5–4 decision reversed the Montana Supreme Court's ruling and remanded the case. Chief Justice John Roberts wrote for the majority, joined by Justices Clarence Thomas, Samuel Alito, Neil Gorsuch, and Brett Kavanaugh. Roberts wrote in his opinion that the no-aid provision (Rule 1) in the program violated the Free Exercise clause, as it "bars religious schools from public benefits solely because of the religious character of the schools" and "also bars parents who wish to send their children to a religious school from those same benefits, again solely because of the religious character of the school." Roberts also asserted that the Montana Supreme Court was wrong to invalidate the entire program on the basis of the no-aid provision in the state constitution. Roberts wrote that "A state need not subsidize private education. But once a state decides to do so, it cannot disqualify some private schools solely because they are religious." Roberts based part of the majority's opinion on the previous Trinity case where the public funds were used for a non-secular purpose (church playground improvement), while contrasting it from the decision of Locke v. Davey, where the Court found that preventing the use of public scholarship funds for students entering into theology studies was constitutional.

Concurrences
Justice Thomas wrote his own concurrence which was joined by Gorsuch. While he agreed with the judgement, Thomas believed the court should have relied on the Establishment Clause, in which the scholarship program, without Rule 1, would not have established any government-backed support of any specific religion.

 
Justice Alito also concurred. Alito cited the Court's earlier decision in Ramos v. Louisiana, in which judgement was partially based on the motivation of outdated Jim Crow laws in the nature of jury verdicts. Alito wrote that the no-aid provision in Montana's constitution must be considered the same way: "Montana's no-aid provision was modeled on the failed Blaine Amendment to the Constitution, which was prompted by virulent prejudice against Catholic immigrants. Montana's claim that the provision merely reflects a state interest in preserving public schools ignores that the public-school (or common-school) movement at the time was itself anti-Catholic. It is also not clear that the anti-Catholic animus was scrubbed from the no-aid provision when it was re-adopted at Montana's constitutional convention in 1972."

Justice Gorsuch also wrote a concurrence, emphasizing that the Free Exercise Clause "protects not just the right to be a religious person, holding beliefs inwardly and secretly; it also protects the right to act on those beliefs outwardly and publicly. Our cases have long recognized the importance of protecting religious actions, not just religious status."

Dissents
Separate dissents were written by Justices Ruth Bader Ginsburg, Stephen Breyer, and Sonia Sotomayor, with Justice Elena Kagan joining on both Ginsburg and Breyer's dissents. Ginsburg, in her dissent, acknowledged to Roberts' point that states are not required to subsidize private education and in the case of Montana, their court discontinued the program, which does not affect the Free Exercise Clause. She wrote, "Petitioners may still send their children to a religious school... There simply are no scholarship funds to be had." Sotomayor called the majority's ruling "perverse" in requiring Montana "to reinstate a tax-credit program that the Constitution did not demand in the first place."

Impact
The Espinoza decision was considered likely to impact subsequent rules in the 38 states with Blaine amendments. At the time of the decision, 17 states had scholarship programs similar to Montana's. However, some of these, including Florida and Indiana, had already found ways to permit such funds to be used for selection of religious schools, despite no-aid clauses in their constitutions. The Institute for Justice, which represented the parents, planned to use the ruling to challenge programs in Maine and Vermont which blocked such use of funds. Then-Secretary of Education Betsy DeVos, a proponent of school choice and of a federal-level tax-credit program, also praised the decision.

References

External links
 

2020 in United States case law
United States Supreme Court cases of the Roberts Court
United States free exercise of religion case law
United States Supreme Court cases